Something to Remember You By may refer to:

  "Something to Remember You By" (1930 song), written by Arthur Schwartz and Howard Dietz
 "Something to Remember You By" (Prairie Oyster song), by Canadian country music group Prairie Oyster
Something to Remember You By, 2013 novel by Gene Wilder